David Cortés Caballero (born 29 August 1979) is a Spanish former professional footballer who played as a right-back.

He appeared in 273 La Liga matches in exactly ten seasons, mainly with Mallorca and Getafe (four years apiece). He won one Copa del Rey with the former club.

Club career
Born in Llerena, Badajoz, Cortés made his professional debut with local CF Extremadura in the Segunda División. He then moved to RCD Mallorca in La Liga (alongside teammate Poli), where he was first-choice for three full seasons, helping the Balearic Islands team to the 2003 edition of the Copa del Rey.

In the summer of 2006, Cortés signed with Madrid's Getafe CF. After splitting duties with Romanian Cosmin Contra in 2006–07, he started the following campaign as the side reached the quarter-finals of the UEFA Cup.

In 2009–10, with Contra already gone, Cortés was greatly overshadowed by new signing Miguel Torres, but still contributed 20 league matches as Getafe qualified for the second time in the club's history to the Europa League. In July 2010, at almost 31, he signed a one-year contract with Hércules CF, returned to the top flight after a 13-year absence.

Cortés was the undisputed first-choice right-back during his only season with the Valencians, who finished 19th and were immediately relegated. In mid-July 2011, he joined Granada CF also from the top division on a two-year deal.

From 2012 to 2014, Cortés competed in the second tier with Hércules and Real Zaragoza. On 15 September 2014, at already 35, he moved abroad for the first time, signing with Danish 1st Division side Aarhus Gymnastikforening for one year and retiring after helping them to win promotion.

References

External links

1979 births
Living people
People from Campiña Sur (Badajoz)
Sportspeople from the Province of Badajoz
Spanish footballers
Footballers from Extremadura
Association football defenders
La Liga players
Segunda División players
CF Extremadura footballers
RCD Mallorca players
Getafe CF footballers
Hércules CF players
Granada CF footballers
Real Zaragoza players
Danish 1st Division players
Aarhus Gymnastikforening players
Spanish expatriate footballers
Expatriate men's footballers in Denmark
Spanish expatriate sportspeople in Denmark